Simaoa is a genus of spiders in the family Mysmenidae. It was first described in 2009 by Miller, Griswold & Yin. , it contains 4 species, all from China.

References

Mysmenidae
Araneomorphae genera
Spiders of China